Lewis Wimbish Plantation was a historic tobacco plantation house and national historic district located near Grassy Creek, Granville County, North Carolina.  The house was built about 1850, and was a two-story, three bay, "T"-plan, heavy timber frame Greek Revival style dwelling.  It had a low hipped roof and front portico with four round columns and two pilasters.  Also on the property were the contributing privy, outbuilding, hipped roof barn, stable, corn crib, tobacco barn, chicken house, and overseer's house.  It has been demolished.

It was listed on the National Register of Historic Places in 1988.

References

Tobacco plantations in the United States
Plantation houses in North Carolina
Houses on the National Register of Historic Places in North Carolina
Historic districts on the National Register of Historic Places in North Carolina
Greek Revival houses in North Carolina
Houses completed in 1850
Houses in Granville County, North Carolina
National Register of Historic Places in Granville County, North Carolina